This is a list of supermarket chains in San Marino.

References 

 List
San Marino
Supermarket chains